Sinployea tenuicostata was a species of small air-breathing land snail, a terrestrial pulmonate gastropod mollusk in the family Charopidae. This species was endemic to the Cook Islands, but has not been found since 1899 and is believed to be extinct.

References

T
Extinct gastropods
Extinct animals of Oceania
Fauna of the Cook Islands
Molluscs of Oceania
Gastropods described in 1872
Taxonomy articles created by Polbot